Fiona Kelly McGregor (born 1965) is an Australian writer, performance artist  and art critic whose third novel, Indelible Ink, won the 2011 The Age Book of the Year award.

Early life and education
McGregor was born in Sydney, New South Wales in 1965.

Career
McGregor has written for a variety of publications including The Sydney Morning Herald, HEAT, Meanjin, Times Literary Supplement, The Age, The Monthly, The Saturday Paper and RealTime. At the beginning of 2021, she began publishing under her full name, Fiona Kelly McGregor. Following the publication of her first two books in 1993 and 1994, she was named one of the inaugural Sydney Morning Herald Best Young Australian Novelists in 1997.

As a performance artist McGregor has toured with You Have the Body, a meditation on unlawful detention, in 2008–09, and she screened her 4-hour video Vertigo at the MOP gallery in Sydney in February 2011. In November 2011, she presented a solo show at Artspace, Sydney, entitled Water Series. Her fourth book, Strange Museums, is a travel memoir about a performance art tour McGregor undertook through Poland in 2006.

Awards and nominations
 1992 winner — John Morrison VFAW short story prize — "Dirt"
 1992 shortlisted The Australian/Vogel Literary Award (for an unpublished manuscript) — Au Pair
 1995 winner Steele Rudd Award — Suck My Toes
 1997 named one of the Best Young Australian Novelists by The Sydney Morning Herald
 2003 shortlisted New South Wales Premier's Literary Awards — Christina Stead Prize for Fiction — Chemical Palace
 2010 shortlisted Western Australian Premier's Book Awards — Fiction — Indelible Ink
 2011 shortlisted Indie Awards — Fiction — Indelible Ink
 2011 shortlisted Barbara Jefferis Award — Indelible Ink
 2011 winner The Age Book of the Year Award — Fiction Prize — Indelible Ink
 2011 winner The Age Book of the Year Award — Book of the Year — Indelible Ink
 2019 winner Woollahra Digital Literary Award — non-fiction — The Hot Desk
2022 shortlisted Victorian Premier's Prize for Nonfiction — Buried Not Dead

Selected works

Novels
 Au Pair (1993)
 Chemical Palace (2002)
 Indelible Ink (2010)
 Iris (2022)

Short story collection
 Suck My Toes (1994)

Non-fiction
 Strange Museums: A Journey Through Poland (2008) (travel memoir, performance art critique)
 A Novel Idea (2019) (photoessay)
Buried Not Dead (2021) (essay collection)

References

External links 

 

1965 births
Living people
Australian performance artists
Australian women novelists
Writers from Sydney
20th-century Australian novelists
20th-century Australian women
Grunge lit authors
Date of birth missing (living people)